Dwight Aerodrome  is located  southeast of Dwight, Ontario, Canada.

References

Registered aerodromes in Ontario